Helen Christinson is an Australian born actress. She has appeared in a number of stage, film and television productions.

Biography
Helen Christinson was born and raised in Brisbane, Queensland. She graduated from Queensland University of Technology with a Bachelor of Fine Arts (Acting). Prior to finishing her acting degree, she was cast in the lead role of the world premiere of The Drowning Bride at La Boîte Theatre. She was nominated for a Matilda Award for best actress for her portrayal of the dual roles of Ellen and Sarmitte.

Following her professional debut, she secured the role of Amanda Webster in QTC's production of Noël Coward's Private Lives directed by Michael Gow and received critical acclaim for her portrayal of the volatile Amanda.

Christinson has continued to perform in numerous theatre productions across Australia including The 39 Steps,  Macbeth, for which she was again nominated for a Matilda Best Actress Award, and A Doll's House, for which she won a Matilda Best Actress Award for her portrayal of Nora.

Christinson's film credits include Reef n Beef, Harrisville and The Underdog's Tale.

She has also appeared in the ABC's World War II drama Sisters of War.

Performing credits

Theatre
2015: Caress/Ache 
2015: Medea 
2014: A Doll's House 
2011: Apologia
2011: The Joy of Text
2010: Macbeth
2009: Secret Bridesmaid's Business
2008: The 39 Steps
2007: John Gabriel Borkman
2006: The Cold Child
2006: Private Lives
2005: The Drowning Bride

Films
2010: Reef n Beef
2007: Harrisville
2005: The Underdog's Tale
2005: Endurance Island

Short films
2011: Awake
2011: Stay Awake
2010: Lightening
2008: The Pitch

Television
2010: Sisters of War
2004: Through My Eyes

References

External links
Official website

21st-century Australian actresses
Living people
Year of birth missing (living people)